The Semilir eruption was a major volcanic event which took place in Indonesia during the Early Miocene. This eruption formed the Semilir Formation and Nglanngran Formation. These two geological formations are in the Southern Mountains of East Java. The eruption created two formations  which consist  of mostly pyroclastic rock (minor lava flows). It has incredible thickness (at least ). In contrast,  The Toba supereruption only formed  ignimbrite. The estimated Semilir eruption age date by isotope method is 21 million years ago.

Geology Background 
Java is between Asia and Australia at the centre of the Indonesian archipelago where the Indo-Australian Plate subducts beneath the Eurasian Plate. There has been subduction at the Java Trench since the Early Cenozoic. An Eocene to Early Miocene volcanic arc in East Java, the Southern Mountains Arc, is parallel to and south of the modern arc. Thick volcanic and volcaniclastic deposits related to this arc are well preserved in East Java and identified volcanic centres are separated by similar distances to volcanoes of the modern arc. New field investigations and stratigraphic studies in East Java have identified the most important features of arc activity in the Southern Mountains. The oldest sedimentary rocks are conglomerates and sandstones that lack volcanic material and were deposited unconformably on a basement that included ophiolitic and continental rocks. In the overlying sedimentary rocks volcanic debris and detrital zircons indicate initiation of the arc, and subduction beneath Java, by the Middle Eocene (42 Ma). The arc was active until the Early Miocene (18 Ma) and volcanic activity was most abundant during the Oligocene to Early Miocene. Volcanic activity was commonly explosive and of Plinian-type. The erupted products range from andesite to rhyolite and formed lava flows, lava domes, volcanic breccias and extensive pyroclastic deposits including flow, air-fall and pyroclastic surge deposits. Volcanic activity along the Southern Mountains Arc culminated in the Early Miocene in a climactic phase of eruptions preserved in the Batu Agung Escarpment, near Yogyakarta. It was during this climactic phase that the Semilir Eruption occurred.

Eruption Product 
The volcanic deposits are fresh and dip uniformly towards the south at approximately 30°. The sequence is divided into three formations which are, from base to top, the Kebobutak, Semilir and Nglanggran Formations (note that Kebobutak Formation is not a same eruption event with Semilir and Nglanggran). The top part of Kebobutak Formation are intensely bioturbated by a Cruziana-type assemblage. The formation is interpreted to be air-fall deposits reworked in a shallow marine sublittoral setting. Above the Kebobutak Formation lies at least  of dacitic pumice, volcanic lithic and crystal-rich tuffs and breccias assigned to the Semilir Formation.

Facies of Semilir Formation 
In East Java the base of the Semilir Formation can be identified by the abrupt termination of bioturbated reworked deposits characteristic of the Kebobutak Formation. The volcanic rocks of the Semilir Formation are characterised by features typical of terrestrial air-fall, pyroclastic surge and flow deposits including dune and antidune structures, crystal layering, well-sorted granular laminations, diffuse bedding, breccias (with metre-scale pumice blocks), thick mantling ashes, and abundant fragments of charcoal. Locally there are water-laid deposits, with scoured irregular bases, flame, traction and suspension structures, and large slump folds indicating an unstable marine slope. Smyth et al. (2011) interpret these observations to indicate the Semilir Formation was erupted in a subaerial setting in which pyroclastic flows travelled across vegetated slopes picking up and baking plant fragments, with some of these flows entering the sea. Some of the primary material would have been redeposited as lahars in distal settings.

Facies of Nglanggran Formation 
Interbedded crystal-rich sand- stones are much thinner. Fragment imbrication within the breccias records diverging west and southwest flow from a source in the northeast part of the Batu Agung Escarpment. There is no evidence of any marine influence, and we interpret the Nglanggran Formation as terrestrial deposits formed by sector or repeated dome collapse, marking the end of arc activity in the Southern Mountains.

Thickness and distribution 
Widely distributed volcanic quartz-rich sandstones of Early Miocene age exposed in East Java that may be Semilir products but have not been precisely dated. The location and character of this formation are described in detail in Smyth et al. (2008). Zircons from the Jaten Formation have a weighted mean SIMS age of 19.6 ± 0.5 Ma and this is consistent with them being reworked products of the Semilir eruption.

References 

Miocene volcanism
Mountains of East Java
Volcanoes of East Java
Pre-Holocene volcanism
Plinian eruptions